(1798-1871) was a Japanese samurai of the Edo period. A senior retainer of the Sendai domain. Munekage was the eleventh Katakura Kojūrō. His childhood name was Sannosuke (三之助) later Kojuro. His father was Katakura Kagesada and his son was Katakura Kuninori.

External links
Katakura family tree (in Japanese)

Samurai
Karō
Katakura clan